Karl Moore may refer to:

Karl Moore (footballer) (born 1988), Irish footballer
Karl Moore (academic), associate professor at McGill University

See also
Karl Moor, Swiss banker
Carl Moore, Barbadian jazz critic and journalist
Carl Richard Moore (1892–1955), American endocrinologist